Carlos Olarán (born 17 November 1961 in Argentina) is an Argentinean retired footballer.

References

Argentine footballers
Living people
Association football defenders
1961 births
Argentinos Juniors footballers
Chacarita Juniors footballers
Racing Club de Avellaneda footballers
All Boys footballers